Hel(l)en Kijo-Bisimba (born 1954) is a human rights activist in Tanzania. She was the executive director of Legal and Human Rights Center until she retired in 2008.

Life
Kijo-Bisimba was born in 1954 in the Kilimanjaro Region in Tanzania. She went to school in the Tanga region at Korogwe High school where she was deputy head girl. She felt unfairly victimised when she was accused of sending an insulting letter to the head teacher. The resulting suspension shaped her feeling of justice when she had to admit to the deed despite her innocence.

Despite this setback at school she went on to university in Dar es Salaam where she graduated in 1985 and then stayed on to gain a Masters in Law in 1994. She went on to gain a doctorate in law from the University of Warwick

Kijo-Bisimba was appointed as the executive director of Legal and Human Rights Center (LHRC) in 1995.

She dealt with Female genital mutilation. FGM was made illegal in Tanzania in 1998 but twenty years after this it was estimated that 10% of girls still suffer this treatment. in 2001 she earned a (2008) "Woman of Courage" award from the US Embassy after she issued a public statement in opposition to the government. She was the first woman to make a public statement when she was objecting to the number of people killed in Zanzibar after election protests.

Kijo-Bisimba resigned as the executive director of Legal and Human Rights Center (LHRC) in 2018. She was replaced by Anna Aloys Henga who was recognised in 2019 as a Woman of Courage.

In 2019 the Tanzanian Minister for Home Affairs Kangi Lugola noted that he could not understand why Kijo-Bisimba had not been honoured by her country.

Personal life
Kijo-Bisimba has four children and she is a regular church go-er.

References

1954 births
Living people
Tanzanian women lawyers
Alumni of the University of Warwick
Weruweru Secondary School alumni
People from Kilimanjaro Region